Keratoderma climactericum is a skin condition characterized by hyperkeratosis of the palms and soles beginning at about the time of menopause.

Causes 
Keratoderma climactericum is either inherited through an abnormal gene, or it is acquired through a change in the health or environment of the individual.

See also 
 Palmoplantar keratoderma
 Keratoderma
 List of cutaneous conditions

References 

Papulosquamous hyperkeratotic cutaneous conditions